Frederick Peter Lock (born 1948) is Professor of English at Queen's University, Kingston, Ontario, Canada and a biographer of Edmund Burke.

Works
Susanna Centlivre (Twayne, 1979)
The Politics of “Gulliver's Travels” (Oxford: Clarendon Press, 1980)
Swift's Tory Politics (University of Delaware Press, 1983)
Burke’s “Reflections on the Revolution in France” (Allen & Unwin, 1985)
(co-editor with Claude Rawson), Collected Poems of Thomas Parnell (University of Delaware Press, 1989).
Edmund Burke. Volume I: 1730–1784 (Oxford: Clarendon Press, 1999).
Edmund Burke. Volume II: 1784–1797 (Oxford: Clarendon Press, 2006).

Notes

1948 births
Living people